BUMP is a 2007 comic book limited series written and illustrated by Mark Kidwell with colors and letters by Jay Fotos.

Publication history
BUMP was initially published as a monthly four-issue comic book limited series by Fangoria Comics. The first issue was published in June 2007.

BUMP was re-released by The Scream Factory in April 2008.

Plot synopsis
Sheriff Lundy is called into action to solve the mystery of the unexplained forces at work on the Dill Farm. A supernatural tale of extreme horror, where even the confines of the grave aren’t able to contain the brutal spirit of serial killer Edgar Dill, and his legion of monstrous Treehuggers.

Spin-offs
BUMP-Hack/Slash Crossover - Originally slated to be a one-shot released by Fangoria Comics, the story was later incorporated into the ongoing Hack/Slash series for Devil's Due Publishing appearing in issues #12 and #13. Written by BUMP creator Mark Kidwell and drawn by Hack/Slash creator Tim Seeley.

Notes

References

External links
 Bump 1, 2, 3 and 4 at Wowio.com